Love and Other Obsessions is the eighteenth album by the American jazz group Spyro Gyra, released in 1995 by GRP Records.

Track listing 
 "Lost and Found" (Jay Beckenstein) – 5:09
 "Ariana" (Jeremy Wall) – 5:07
 "Serengeti" (Dave Samuels) – 4:54
 "Fine Time to Explain" (Scott Kreitzer) – 4:40
 "Third Street"  (Beckenstein) – 4:48
 "Group Therapy" (Beckenstein, Scott Ambush, Julio Fernandez, Joel Rosenblatt, Samuels, Tom Schuman) – 5:45
 "Horizon's Edge" (Beckenstein) – 5:01
 "Let's Say Goodbye" (Kreitzer, Anthony Pompa) – 4:32
 "On Liberty Road (for South Africa)" (Ambush) – 5:52
 "Rockin' a Heart Place" (Beckenstein, Rosenblatt) – 5:23
 "Baby Dreams" (Schuman)  – 4:43

Personnel 

Spyro Gyra
 Jay Beckenstein – saxophones, arrangements (1, 5, 6)
 Tom Schuman – keyboards, arrangements (6, 11)
 Julio Fernandez – guitars, arrangements (6, 10)
 Scott Ambush – bass guitar, arrangements (6, 9)
 Joel Rosenblatt – drums, arrangements (6)
 Dave Samuels – vibraphone, marimba, mallet synthesizer, marching drum, arrangements (6)

Additional Musicians, Arrangements and Vocals
 Russell Ferrante – keyboards (3), arrangements (3)
 Steve Skinner – drum programming (2)
 Sammy Merendino – drum programming (5)
 Bashiri Johnson – percussion
 Chieli Minucci – arrangements (2)
 Alex Acuña – arrangements (3)
 Vaneese Thomas – vocals (2)
 Billy Cliff – lead vocals (3, 4), backing vocals (8)
 Keith Fluitt – backing vocals (4, 8)
 Jana Jillis – backing vocals (4, 8)
 Anthony Michael Pompa – backing vocals (4, 8), arrangements (8)
 Barrington "Bo" Henderson – lead vocals (8)
 Deniece Williams – lead vocals (8)
 Wondress Hutchinson – backing vocals (8)

No Sweat Horns
 Scott Kreitzer – saxophones, alto flute, flute, bass clarinet, horn arrangements, arrangements (4, 7, 8)
 Randy Andos – trombone, bass trombone 
 Barry Danielian – trumpet, flugelhorn

Production 
 Jay Beckenstein – producer 
 Jeremy Wall – associate producer
 Scott Kreitzer – co-producer (4, 8)
 Doug Oberkircher – recording, mixing 
 Larry Swist – additional recording 
 Robert Sicilliano – assistant engineer
 Ted Jensen – mastering 
 Cara Bridgins – production coordinator 
 Hollis King – art direction 
 Alba Acevedo – graphic design 
 Laurie Goldman – graphic design
 Lois Greenfield – photography 
 David A. Wagner – photography

Studios 
 Recorded and Mixed at BearTracks Studios (Suffern, New York).
 Mastered at Sterling Sound (New York City, New York).

References

External links
Spyro Gyra official web site

1995 albums
Spyro Gyra albums
GRP Records albums